John de Villiers may refer to:

 John de Villiers, 1st Baron de Villiers (1842–1914), Cape lawyer and judge
 John de Villiers (cricketer, born 1930) (1930–1969), South African cricketer
 John de Villiers (cricketer, born 1956) (born 1956), South African cricketer